Cyperus disjunctus is a species of sedge that is endemic to parts of north eastern Australia.

The species was first formally described by the botanist Charles Baron Clarke in 1908.

See also
 List of Cyperus species

References

disjunctus
Taxa named by Charles Baron Clarke
Plants described in 1908
Flora of Queensland
Flora of New South Wales